Woman of the World/To Make a Man is the fourteenth solo studio album by American country music singer-songwriter Loretta Lynn. It was released on July 7, 1969, by Decca Records.

The album includes a cover of "Stand by Your Man", originally by Tammy Wynette, who was Lynn's biggest rival at the time. Lynn also recorded other covers for the album, including Merle Haggard's "Today I Started Loving You Again" and Brenda Lee's "Johnny One Time".

Critical reception 

Billboard published a review of the album in the issue dated July 19, 1969, which said, "Loretta Lynn has no peers when it comes to convincing with a song; the unique substance of her voice tingles in your mind long after the last note. And when she sings her hit "Woman of the World", watch out—it's pure power. Her big single, "To Make a Man" is here too. And her versions of "Johnny One Note" and "No One Will Ever Know" are emotion-packed nerve jarrers."

In the July 19 issue, Cashbox published a review that said, "Loretta Lynn's recent country chart topper
lends its title to a set packed with feelingful vocals and some mighty pretty ballads. Strong sales inevitable on session that includes "Johnny One Time", "No One Will Ever Know", "Today I Started Loving You Again", "Stand by Your Man" and "I'm Lonesome for Trouble Tonight". To be watched closely."

AllMusic gave the album an average rating, saying, "a couple of misfire tracks keep this from being the best of this country singing queen's many fine albums for this label." The website gave the album three out of five stars.

Commercial performance 
The album peaked at No. 2 on the US Billboard Hot Country LP's chart and at No. 148 on the US Billboard Top LP's chart.

The lead single, "Woman of the World (Leave My World Alone)", was released in February 1969 and peaked at No. 1 on the US Billboard Hot Country Singles. The second single, "To Make a Man (Feel Like a Man)", was released in June 1969 and peaked at No. 3.

Recording
Recording sessions for the album took place over four sessions at Bradley's Barn in Mount Juliet, Tennessee, beginning on April 2, 1969. Three additional sessions followed on April 9 (yielding six of the album's eleven songs), May 14 and May 28. "Woman of the World (Leave My World Alone)" was recorded during the November 18, 1968 session for 1969's Your Squaw Is on the Warpath.

Track listing

Personnel
Adapted from the album liner notes and Decca recording session records.
Willie Ackerman – drums
Harold Bradley – electric bass guitar
Owen Bradley – producer
Larry Butler – piano
Floyd Cramer – piano
Ray Edenton – guitar, acoustic guitar
Lloyd Green – steel guitar
Buddy Harman – drums
Junior Huskey – bass
The Jordanaires – background vocals
Bruce Lehrke – liner notes
Loretta Lynn – lead vocals
Grady Martin – guitar, lead electric guitar
Hargus Robbins – piano
Hal Rugg – steel guitar
Jerry Shook – guitar
Pete Wade – guitar
James Wilkerson – vibes

Charts 
Album

Singles

References 

1969 albums
Loretta Lynn albums
Albums produced by Owen Bradley
Decca Records albums